The Katzenstein is a mountain in Saxony, southeastern Germany.

View 
From the plateau there are extensive views to the east and, at its foot lies the Schwarzwassertal view. To the east is the elongated, arch-shaped rock formation known as the Ringmauer. To the southeast is the Rabenberg with the steep summit of the Liebenstein. This spot was once the site of Liebenstein Castle, a 12th-century castle whose tower ruins were still visible in the 18th century.

Mountains of Saxony
Mountains of the Ore Mountains